Edward Gleeson (born 1920, date of death unknown) was an Irish hurler who played as a left corner-forward for the Tipperary senior team.

Gleeson made his first appearance for the team during the 1945 championship and was a regular member of the starting fifteen for just two full seasons. During that time he won one All-Ireland medal and one Munster medal. At club level Gleeson played with Thurles Sarsfields.

References

1920 births
Year of death missing
All-Ireland Senior Hurling Championship winners
Thurles Sarsfields hurlers
Tipperary inter-county hurlers